Purple King may refer to:
 a variety of green beans
 Purple King (Gladiolus variety), a variety of Gladiolus